AMMAD Anti-Magnetic Mine Actuating Device is an anti-mine system manufactured by Israel Aerospace Industries that safely neutralizes (triggers) magnetically-fused land mines  before a vehicle passes over the threat. It works by generating a magnetic field that precedes the vehicle at a safe standoff range (5 ft. to 16 ft. in front of the vehicle).

See also
  Countermine System

References

Military equipment of Israel
Mine warfare countermeasures
IAI products